Sergey Rabchenko (birth name: Siarhei Rabchanka, born 23 February 1986 in Minsk) is a Belarusian professional boxer. He currently fights in the light middleweight division.

Professional career
After an amateur career which consisted of 217 wins from 238 fights, Rabchenko made his professional debut in September 2006 with a first-round knock-out victory over Andrei Matveeu in Minsk. Since 2011 he has been based in the United Kingdom, where he is promoted by Hatton Promotions and is trained by Ricky Hatton. After a second-round knockout over Martin Concepcion in his first fight in the UK he competed in his first twelve-round fight, beating Bradley Pryce by a unanimous decision. In June 2012 he won his first significant title when he beat Ryan Rhodes in the seventh round via a body shot to win the EBU light middleweight belt. He made the first defence of his title against Cedric Vitu at the Manchester Arena in November 2012 where he won by split decision.

Rabchenko recorded his first professional loss against Australian Anthony Mundine.

Professional boxing record

References

External links

 

|-

1986 births
Living people
Sportspeople from Minsk
Belarusian male boxers
Light-middleweight boxers
European Boxing Union champions